John H. Brigerman (December 11, 1902 - August 2, 1968) was a lawyer, realtor, and state legislator in Pennsylvania.

Birgerman was born in Wyandotte County, Kansas. He graduated from John Marshall Law School in  Chicago and University of Indianapolis as well as Friendship N. & I. College and La Salle University. He was a delegate to the Indiana State Democratic Convention  in 1928 and chaired the 47th Ward Democratic Executive Committee. A Democrat, he was elected to the Pennsylvania House of Representatives for the 1937 term and the also served in the Pennsylvania House in 1943. He ran unsuccessfully for 1939 and 1945 terms. He died in Philadelphia and is buried at Rolling Green Memorial Park in West Chester, Pennsylvania. He was included in a 1974 exhibition.

See also
List of African-American officeholders (1900-1959)

References

1902 births
1968 deaths
People from Wyandotte County, Kansas
John Marshall Law School (Chicago) alumni
University of Indianapolis alumni
La Salle University alumni
Indiana Democrats
African-American state legislators in Pennsylvania
Members of the Pennsylvania House of Representatives
Deaths in Pennsylvania
20th-century African-American politicians
African-American men in politics
20th-century American politicians
American real estate brokers
Pennsylvania lawyers
African-American lawyers